Siddham may refer to:

Siddhaṃ script, an alphabet and numeral script that originated and was used in India; now used in East Asia only
Siddham (Unicode block)
Siddham (film), a 2009 Telugu action film